Alan Weiss may refer to:
 Alan Weiss (comics) (born 1948), American comic book artist 
 Alan Weiss (musician) (born 1950), American musician
 Alan Weiss (mathematician) (born 1955), American mathematician and pioneer
 Alan Weiss (entrepreneur) (born 1946), American entrepreneur and author